Juan el de la Vara (born 1938) is a Spanish flamenco singer. He has worked with numerous artists, including Paco de Lucía.

References

20th-century Spanish male singers
Flamenco singers
1938 births
Living people
Place of birth missing (living people)
Date of birth missing (living people)